CS Phoenix Galați is a professional women's basketball team from Galați, Romania. The team plays in the Liga Națională, following their championship in the Liga I in 2013.

Trophies
 Liga I
Winners (1): 2012–13

Current roster

References

External links
 Eurobasket 
 frbaschet.ro 

Galați
Sport in Galați
Basketball teams in Romania
Women's basketball teams in Romania
Basketball teams established in 2000
2000 establishments in Romania